Tugay Kaçar (born 1 January 1994) is a Turkish footballer who plays as a midfielder for Boluspor. Tugay is a youth international for Turkey.

References

External links
 
 
 

1994 births
Living people
People from Uşak
Turkish footballers
Turkey youth international footballers
Süper Lig players
Association football midfielders
Uşakspor footballers
Denizlispor footballers
Ofspor footballers
Ankaraspor footballers
Karşıyaka S.K. footballers
Giresunspor footballers